Gentianine is a pyridine-derived alkaloid.  Originally isolated in 1944 from Gentiana kirilowi, it has also been found in Gentiana macrophylla, fenugreek, Strychnos angolensis, Strychnos xantha, and other plants.

Gentianine is a crystalline solid with a melting point of 82-83 °C.  It is a base that forms salts, such as the hydrochloride salt, upon treatment with acids.

Gentianine has been studied for its potential anti-inflammatory properties.

References

Alkaloids
Pyridines
Lactones
Heterocyclic compounds with 2 rings